Géberjén is a village in Szabolcs-Szatmár-Bereg county, in the Northern Great Plain region of eastern Hungary.

Geography

History
The first written mention of Géberjén appears in a medieval text under the name "Gabrian". Historically, the village suffered frequent floods, with the most recent occurring in 1972 and the most devastating in 1882.

References

Populated places in Szabolcs-Szatmár-Bereg County